Oak Ridge is a town in northwestern Guilford County, North Carolina, United States. The population was 6,185 at the 2010 census, up from 3,988 in 2000. As of 2018, the population had risen to an estimated 6,977.

History
The town is home to Oak Ridge Military Academy, a private, co-educational, college-preparatory military boarding school. Founded in 1852, it is the third-oldest military school in the nation still in operation, and it is the official military school of North Carolina, as designated by the state legislature.

Until the late 1990s, the Oak Ridge area was mostly rural farmland with numerous tobacco farms. However, since its incorporation as a town in 1998, Oak Ridge has seen rapid growth in its population. Many of the area's farms have been sold to developers and turned into upper-class housing developments, and several shopping centers have been built along the NC 68 corridor, especially at its intersection with Oak Ridge Road (NC 150), near the military academy.

Each Easter weekend from 1945 to 2013, the community hosted a popular horse show.

The Jesse Benbow House II, Guilford Mill, and Oak Ridge Military Academy Historic District are listed on the National Register of Historic Places.

Geography
Oak Ridge is located in northwestern Guilford County at  (36.166944, -79.982577). It is bordered to the north by Stokesdale, to the east by Summerfield, and to the west by Kernersville. North Carolina Highway 150 (named "Oak Ridge Road") leads east to Summerfield, and west to Kernersville.

Demographics

2020 census

As of the 2020 United States census, there were 7,474 people, 2,275 households, and 1,969 families residing in the town.

2000 census
As of the census of 2000, there were 3,988 people, 1,382 households, and 1,173 families residing in the town. The population density was 271.9 people per square mile (105.0/km). There were 1,462 housing units at an average density of 99.7 per square mile (38.5/km). The racial makeup of the town was 93.48% White, 4.21% African American, 0.28% Native American, 0.73% Asian, 0.63% from other races, and 0.68% from two or more races. Hispanic or Latino of any race were 1.30% of the population.

There were 1,382 households, out of which 44.6% had children under the age of 18 living with them, 78.4% were married couples living together, 4.2% had a female householder with no husband present, and 15.1% were non-families. 11.5% of all households were made up of individuals, and 3.9% had someone living alone who was 65 years of age or older. The average household size was 2.89 and the average family size was 3.15.

In the town, the population was spread out, with 29.7% under the age of 18, 4.7% from 18 to 24, 31.4% from 25 to 44, 26.9% from 45 to 64, and 7.4% who were 65 years of age or older. The median age was 38 years. For every 100 females, there were 97.8 males. For every 100 females age 18 and over, there were 98.9 males.

The median income for a household in the town was $74,609, and the median income for a family was $82,070. Males had a median income of $56,250 versus $35,952 for females. The per capita income for the town was $29,346. About 2.2% of families and 3.8% of the population were below the poverty line, including 3.6% of those under age 18 and 3.8% of those age 65 or over.

Notable people
Chris Daughtry, contestant from American Idol and singer of the rock band Daughtry
Dale Earnhardt Jr., NASCAR driver; attended local military academy prior to his racing career 
Kevin Harvick, NASCAR driver; left in 2014
Ashnikko, singer and rapper; born here

References

External links
 Town of Oak Ridge official website
 

Towns in Guilford County, North Carolina
Towns in North Carolina